The fifth season of JAG premiered on CBS on September 21, 1999, and concluded on May 23, 2000. The season, starring David James Elliott and Catherine Bell, was produced by Belisarius Productions in association with, what was then-known as, Paramount Television (its post 2006 name is CBS Studios).

Plot 
Lieutenant Commander Harmon "Harm" Rabb Jr. (David James Elliott), now back as an F-14 Tomcat pilot aboard the USS Patrick Henry, finds himself forced to defend a young lieutenant who has mistakenly fired upon Russian armored vehicles ("King of the Greenie Board"), while his former partner (and newly promoted) Lieutenant Colonel Sarah "Mac" MacKenzie (Catherine Bell) continues to enforce, prosecute and defend the Uniform Code of Military Justice (UCMJ) from within the Headquarters of the Judge Advocate General, a division of the Department of the Navy. This season, Mac is pitted against Mic Brumby (Trevor Goddard) in court ("Rules of Engagement"), Harm is forced to push a plane to safety using a tailhook ("True Calling") before returning to JAG ("The Return"), Mac investigate psy-ops ("Psychic Warrior"), Harm is awarded the Distinguished Flying Cross ("Front and Center"), Bud (Patrick Labyorteaux) is kidnapped ("Rogue"), and, on the orders of Rear Admiral A.J. Chegwidden (John M. Jackson), the team travel to Sydney, New South Wales, Australia ("Boomerang"). Meanwhile, Gunnery Sergeant Victor "Gunny" Galindez (Randy Vasquez) is accused of gay-bashing ("People v. Gunny"), Harm investigates a decade-old murder ("Body Talk"), and Mic resigns his Australian commission ("Surface Warfare").

Production 
Prior to the start of JAG fifth season, the series entered syndication. At the time season five was first aired in the United States, JAG was seen in over 90 countries worldwide.

From 12 to 14 July 1999, the JAG production team including its three main actors were allowed by the US Navy to film scenes on location aboard the nuclear-powered aircraft carrier USS John C. Stennis (CVN-74), while she sailed off the coast of California. It was the first time the JAG production team were on board an active aircraft carrier at sea and while it was conducting flight operations. The footage obtained from this visit were used for the first three episodes of the season.

The 100th and 101st episodes of JAG were partially shot with the main cast on several locations in and around Sydney, New South Wales, Australia. Among the locations were Fleet Base East and Sydney Airport. These were the only episodes of JAG filmed outside the United States.

Cast and characters

Main

Also starring

Recurring

Episodes

See also
 1999–2000 United States network television schedule

Notes

References 

05
1999 American television seasons
2000 American television seasons
Works about the Serbian Mafia